The 1984 Southwest Conference women's basketball tournament was held March 5–10, 1984, at Hofheinz Pavilion in Houston, Texas. 

Number 1 seed  defeated 2 seed  83-73 to win their 2nd championship and receive the conference's automatic bid to the 1984 NCAA tournament.

Format and seeding 
The tournament consisted of a 6 team single-elimination tournament. The top two seeds had a bye to the Semifinals. The First round games occurred at campus sites.

Tournament

References 

Southwest Conference women's Basketball Tournament
1984 in women's basketball
1984 in sports in Texas
Basketball in Houston